Selma Borst (born 6 September 1983 in Wieringerwaard) is a Dutch runner.

Career highlights

European Championships
2007 - Vaasa, 3rd, European Cup for countries, 5,000 m

Dutch National Championships
2002 - Assen, 3rd, 1,500 m (juniors)
2004 - Utrecht, 3rd, 5,000 m
2005 - Schoorl, 2nd, 10,000 m road
2005 - The Hague, 1st, Half marathon
2005 - Drunen, 2nd, 10,000 m track
2006 - Schoorl, 3rd, 10,000 m road
2006 - Norg, 3rd, long cross
2006 - The Hague, 1st, Half marathon
2007 - Amsterdam, 1st, 5,000 m
2007 - The Hague, 3rd, Half marathon
2007 - Schoorl, 2nd, 10,000 m road
2007 - Wageningen, 2nd, long cross

Personal bests

External links

teamdistancerunners profile

1983 births
Living people
Dutch female long-distance runners
Dutch female middle-distance runners
People from Anna Paulowna
Sportspeople from North Holland
20th-century Dutch women
20th-century Dutch people
21st-century Dutch women